Bandar-e Tauneh (also Romanized as Bandar-e Ţā‘ūneh; also known as Bandar-e Ţāḩūneh, Bandar Tahooneh, Ţāḩūneh, Ţā‘ūneh, and Tāvūneh) is a village in Bandar Charak Rural District, Shibkaveh District, Bandar Lengeh County, Hormozgan Province, Iran. At the 2006 census, its population was 205, in 36 families.

References 

Populated places in Bandar Lengeh County